Lysiosepalum hexandrum is a species of flowering plant in the mallow family that is endemic to Australia.

Description
The species grows as a dense, erect shrub to 20–90 cm in height. The leaves are 10–45 mm long and 1.4–4 mm wide. The blue-purple-pink flowers appear from August to November.

Distribution and habitat
The plants are found in the Avon Wheatbelt and Mallee IBRA bioregions of south-west Western Australia. They grow on sandy, clay, loamy or gravelly soils and lateritic breakaways.

References

hexandrum
Rosids of Western Australia
Malvales of Australia
Taxa named by Spencer Le Marchant Moore
Plants described in 1921